Michael Hermosillo (born January 17, 1995) is an American professional baseball outfielder in the New York Yankees organization. He previously played for the Los Angeles Angels and Chicago Cubs. Hermosillo was drafted by the Angels in the 28th round of the 2013 Major League Baseball draft. He made his MLB debut in 2018.

Early life
Hermosillo was born in Mesa, Arizona.  He attended Ottawa Township High School in Ottawa, Illinois. Along with baseball, he also played football in high school and had committed to the University of Illinois to play college football and college baseball.

Hermosillo participated in the Chicago White Sox Double Duty Classic in 2012 and 2013.

Career

Los Angeles Angels
Hermosillo was drafted by the Los Angeles Angels in the 28th round of the 2013 Major League Baseball draft. He signed with the Angels rather than attend Illinois. He made his professional debut with the Arizona League Angels that same year and played in 11 games.

Hermosillo played 2014 with the Orem Owlz where he batted .244 with three home runs and 23 RBIs in 54 games, 2015 with Orem and the Burlington Bees where he slashed .231/.344/.263 in 93 games, and 2016 with Burlington and the Inland Empire 66ers where he batted .317./.402/.467 with six home runs and 39 RBIs in 77 games. After the 2016 season he played in the Arizona Fall League.

He started 2017 with Inland Empire and was promoted to the Mobile BayBears and Salt Lake Bees during the season. In 120 total games between the three teams, he batted .267 with nine home runs, 44 RBIs, and 35 stolen bases. The Angels added him to their 40-man roster after the season.

He began 2018 with Salt Lake, for whom he batted .267/.357/.480 with 12 home runs and 10 stolen bases for the season.

He made his Major League debut on May 18, 2018. He was called back up on June 3 in place of Kole Calhoun. In 2018 with the Angels he batted .211/.274/.333 with 1 home run and 1 RBI in 57 at bats. In 2019 for Los Angeles, Hermosillo hit .139/.304/.222 with 3 RBI and no homers in 36 at-bats. In 2020, Hermosillo only stepped up to the plate 10 times, and had 2 hits, 2 RBI and a stolen base before he was designated for assignment on August 23, 2020. He became a free agent on November 2, 2020.

Chicago Cubs
On December 2, 2020, Hermosillo signed a minor league contract with the Chicago Cubs organization. On August 17, 2021, Hermosillo's contract was selected by the Cubs. On November 30, Hermosillo was non-tendered by the Cubs, making him a free agent.

On December 1, 2021, Hermosillo re-signed with the Cubs on a one-year contract.

On October 15, 2022, Hermosillo elected to become a free agent.

New York Yankees
On December 16, 2022, Hermosillo signed a minor league deal with the New York Yankees.

References

External links

 

1995 births
Arizona League Angels players
Baseball players from Arizona
Burlington Bees players
Chicago Cubs players
Inland Empire 66ers of San Bernardino players
Iowa Cubs players
Living people
Los Angeles Angels players
Major League Baseball outfielders
Mobile BayBears players
Orem Owlz players
Salt Lake Bees players
Scottsdale Scorpions players
Sportspeople from Mesa, Arizona